Dominik Życki (born 15 February 1974) is a Polish sailor. He was born in Warsaw. He competed at the 2008 Summer Olympics in Beijing, where he placed fourth in the star class together with Mateusz Kusznierewicz.

References

Polish male sailors (sport)
1974 births
Living people
Sportspeople from Warsaw
Sailors at the 2008 Summer Olympics – Star
Sailors at the 2012 Summer Olympics – Star
Olympic sailors of Poland
Star class world champions
World champions in sailing for Poland